Animal Paradise is a 2007 video game by Agatsuma Entertainment for the Nintendo DS.  It was originally slated for release in North America as Pocket Pets, by O~3 Entertainment. Empire Interactive later published the title as Animal Paradise, as it had already done in Europe. The game features famous photographs in the Hana Deka style by Japanese photographer Yoneo Morita. Its sequel, Animal Paradise Wild, was released in 2009.

Animal Paradise Wild

Animal Paradise Wild is a video game developed by Empire Interactive and published by Zoo Games, as a sequel to Animal Paradise for the Nintendo DS.

Reception

Animal Paradise received generally poor reviews, receiving a rating of three out of ten from Nintendo World Report and a Metascore of 49.

References

External links
 Nintendo World Report review
 IGN review
 Animal Paradise summary from GameSpot
 GameSpot Summary for Animal Paradise Wild

2007 video games
Agatsuma Entertainment games
Nintendo DS games
Nintendo DS-only games
Video games developed in Japan
Video games developed in the United Kingdom
Virtual pet video games
Empire Interactive games